Baltic League may refer to:

 Baltic League, Baltic men's football club tournament
 1990 Baltic League, Soviet tournament for its Baltic republics with undefined status
 Women's Baltic Football League, Baltic women's football club tournament
 Baltic Basketball League, Baltic states men's basketball league
 Baltic Women's Basketball League, Baltic states women's basketball league
 Baltic League (ice hockey), a defunct Baltic states men's ice hockey league
 Baltic Hockey League, a Baltic states men's ice hockey league
 Baltic Men Volleyball League, Baltic States men's volleyball league
 Baltic Women's Volleyball League, Baltic states women's volleyball league
 Baltic Handball League, Baltic states handball league

See also
 Baltic Cup (disambiguation)

Sport in the Baltic states